Carol LeGrant Lewis (born August 8, 1963) is an American former track and field athlete who specialized in the long jump. She is the 1983 World Championship bronze medalist, and a 4-time US Champion. Her best long jump of 7.04 meters in 1985 is the former American record. She is the sister of 9-time Olympic gold medalist Carl Lewis, and former professional soccer player Cleveland Lewis. She is also the daughter of retired American hurdler Evelyn Lawler.

Career
Born in Birmingham, Alabama, Lewis qualified for the 1980 U.S. Olympic team but was unable to compete due to the 1980 Summer Olympics boycott. She received one of the 461 Congressional Gold Medals created especially for the spurned athletes. She first competed internationally at the Liberty Bell Classic, an alternate event for boycotted athletes, where she won a silver medal with a jump of 6.60 meters. She won the Dial Award that year in recognition of her achievements. While at Willingboro High School in New Jersey, setting the high school indoor long jump record at 21' 7.5" (6.59 meters) in 1981. She later went to the University of Houston, following in the footsteps of her older brother. At Houston, she won 2 National Collegiate Athletic Association long jump championship titles in 1983: 21-11 3/4 and 1985: 22-1 She also joined her brother on the Santa Monica Track Club.

Lewis won the USA Outdoor Track and Field Championships for the first time in 1982, the first of four National championships.  Her 6.81m jump from that competition is the current United States, North American and Pan American Junior record.  Further success came in 1983, with a win at the NCAA Outdoor Championships and bronze medal at the 1983 World Championships in Athletics.

After winning the Olympic Trials, she represented the United States at the 1984 Summer Olympics and managed to finish in ninth place at the age of twenty. The following year she won the NCAA Outdoor Championships for a second time and took bronze at the World Cup in Athletics. In Zürich in August that year, Lewis reached her peak, setting a personal best and breaking the American record in the long jump twice at the same track meeting. Her record of 7.04 m stood for two years until it was beaten by Jackie Joyner-Kersee.

Lewis competed at the 1987 IAAF World Indoor Championships, finishing in ninth position with a best jump of 6.23 m. She qualified for her third Olympics in 1988, failing to qualify for the final by just one centimeter.

Following her retirement from track and field, she went on to work as a commentator for various events for NBC Sports. She commentated on the track events for the 1996, 2000 and 2008 Summer Olympics.

In 2000, Lewis began competing in two-woman bobsled and, although she failed to make the 2002 US Olympic team, she served as Shauna Rohbock's brakeman at the 2002 World Cup in Calgary.

Personal bests

All information taken from IAAF Profile.

National titles
4-time United States long jump champion – 1982, 1983, 1985 and 1986
4-time United States Indoor long jump champion –1983, 1984, 1985 and 1991
2-time NCAA long jump champion – 1983 and 1985

International competitions

References

1963 births
Living people
American female long jumpers
Olympic track and field athletes of the United States
Athletes (track and field) at the 1984 Summer Olympics
Athletes (track and field) at the 1988 Summer Olympics
Track and field athletes from Birmingham, Alabama
African-American female track and field athletes
World Athletics Championships medalists
Track and field broadcasters
Houston Cougars women's track and field athletes
Congressional Gold Medal recipients
People from Willingboro Township, New Jersey
Track and field athletes from New Jersey
Sportspeople from Burlington County, New Jersey
Willingboro High School alumni
21st-century African-American people
21st-century African-American women
20th-century African-American sportspeople
20th-century African-American women
Universiade medalists in athletics (track and field)
Universiade gold medalists for the United States